Oman national under-20 football team  is controlled by Oman Football Association and represents Oman in international under-20 football competitions.

History
On 2 February 2014, Oman Football Association appointed former Oman national football team manager Rasheed Jaber Al-Yafai as the head manager of Oman national under-20 football team. His immediate task was to prepare the team for the 2014 AFC U-19 Championship to be hosted from October 9–23 in Myanmar.

Current squad
Oman announced their final squad of 23 players on 22 February 2023.

Head coach:  David Gordo

Tournament Records

FIFA U-20 World Cup

AFC U-20 Asian Cup

Kits and sponsors

On February 3, 2014, Oman Football Association is currently confirmed tie-up with Italian sports apparel manufacturer Kappa. A joint venture agreement was signed by sportswear giant Kappa and the OFA's apparel brand Taj Oman. In a 4-year deal, Kappa will produce the kit worn by all the Oman National football teams bearing the Taj mark, and will provide Oman with a large range of sportswear specific for the country. The deal will see both the names (Kappa & Taj) on the kit worn by the National teams and on all retail items. Oman Air also renewed its deal on the same day with the OFA till the end of the 2013-14 season.

See also
Oman national football team
Oman women's national football team

References

External links
Official Oman Football Association Website
Oman national under-20 football team - FUTBOL24.COM
Oman national under-20 football team - worldfootball.net

under-20
Asian national under-20 association football teams